Grapevine leafroll-associated virus 3 (GLRaV-3) is a grapevine infecting virus in the family Closteroviridae, genus Ampelovirus.

GLRaV-3 is an economically important virus causing Grapevine leafroll disease in grapevine worldwide.

See also 
 List of viruses

References

External links 
 uniprot.org/taxonomy

Closteroviridae
Viral grape diseases